The 1982 St. Louis Cardinals season was the franchise’s 63rd year with the National Football League and the 23rd season in St. Louis. It was the Cardinals first postseason appearance since 1975, and their last before the team’s 1988 move to Arizona, as well as the last NFL postseason appearance for any St. Louis franchise until the Rams’ Super Bowl championship season of 1999. The 1982 Football Cardinals were 5–4 during the regular-season.

This season would be the last season the Cardinals made the playoffs until 1998, when the team was far into its current tenure in Arizona.

Offseason

NFL Draft

Personnel

Staff

Roster

Regular season

Schedule

Week 3

Playoffs

NFC: Green Bay Packers 41, St. Louis Cardinals 16

Standings

Awards and records 
 Luis Sharpe, NFL All-Rookie team

References 

 Cardinals on Pro Football Reference
 Cardinals on jt-sw.com

St. Louis
Arizona Cardinals seasons